Lauren Egea Acame (born 8 January 1996) is a Spanish professional footballer who plays for Salamanca CF UDS B as a central defender.

Personal life
Egea's father Sergio and his brother Alexis are also footballers and defenders. The former is retired, and is currently a coach.

Professional career
Egea was born in Alicante, Valencia. He joined Hércules CF's youth setup in 2007, aged 11.

On 12 April 2014, while still a junior, Egea played his first match as a professional, replacing Aitor Fernández in the 79th minute of a 1–2 loss at UD Las Palmas in the Segunda División. He appeared in two matches during the campaign, which ended in relegation.

On 7 August 2014 Egea moved to RCD Espanyol, initially assigned to the Juvenil squad. On 15 August of the following year, he was loaned to Segunda División B side UE Cornellà for one year.

After being rarely used, Egea rescinded his contract and moved to Tercera División club Real Murcia Imperial. He moved to Mexico in January 2017, joining Club Universidad Nacional's reserve side as his father was in charge of the first team.

While in Mexico, Egea switched his position from a forward to a central defender, and spent the 2017–18 season on loan at Club Atlético Zacatepec, but failed to appear for the club. He returned to Spain in 2018, and subsequently resumed his career in the lower leagues, representing CFI Alicante, CD Praviano, CD Murada, Athletic Club Torrellano and Salamanca CF UDS B.

References

External links

1996 births
Living people
People from Alicante
Spanish footballers
Footballers from the Valencian Community
Association football forwards
Segunda División players
Segunda División B players
Tercera División players
Hércules CF players
RCD Espanyol B footballers
UE Cornellà players